Herpetoreas murlen, or the Murlen keelback, is a species of natricine snake endemic to India.

References

murlen
Reptiles of India
Endemic fauna of India
Reptiles described in 2022